Vaccitech plc is a biotechnology company developing vaccines and immunotherapies for infectious diseases and cancer, such as hepatitis B, HPV and prostate cancer.

Technology
The company's platform includes Chimpanzee Adenovirus Oxford (ChAdOx) and Modified Vaccinia Ankara (MVA), two viral vectors which safely mimic viral infection in human cells and elicit antibody and T cell responses to pathogens and tumours.

History
The company was founded in 2016 as a University spin-off by Sarah Gilbert and Adrian V. S. Hill at The Jenner Institute, University of Oxford.

Vaccitech has been financed and supported by M&G Catalyst, Google Ventures (GV), Fosun International, Tencent, Huawei, Sequoia Capital, GeneMatrix, Liontrust Asset Management, Korea Investment Partners and Oxford Sciences Innovation (OSI). 

In early 2020, Vaccitech and the University of Oxford co-invented a vaccine for COVID-19 using the ChAdOx platform.

COVID-19 vaccine
In July 2020, it was reported that people in Brazil, South Africa and the US had been recruited to populate the vaccine trials.

In July 2020, Vaccitech scientists reported in The Lancet a "single-blind, randomised controlled trial in five trial sites in the UK of a chimpanzee adenovirus-vectored vaccine (ChAdOx1 nCoV-19) expressing the SARS-CoV-2 spike protein." Several subjects needed prophylactic paracetamol to minimize their adverse reactions.

Listing on NASDAQ

Vaccitech held an initial public offering of shares in 2021, listing on NASDAQ on 30 April 2021 under the symbol VACC.

References

British companies established in 2016
Companies based in Oxford
Biotechnology companies of the United Kingdom
Biotechnology companies established in 2016
Vaccine producers
COVID-19 vaccine producers
Medical research
Companies listed on the Nasdaq